Kenneth Grant (1924–2011) was an English occultist.

Kenneth Grant may also refer to:
Kenneth J. Grant (1839–1932), Canadian Presbyterian missionary
Kenneth Grant (umpire) (1899–1989), West Indian cricket umpire
Kenneth Grant (bishop) (1900–1959), Scottish Roman Catholic bishop
Kenneth Grant (politician) (1866–1922), member of the Queensland Legislative Assembly
Ken Grant (born 1967), photographer